The William H. Harsha bridge is a cable-stayed bridge carrying U.S. Route 62 and U.S. Route 68 that connects Maysville, Kentucky, and Aberdeen, Ohio, over the Ohio River. It is named for William Harsha, who represented the Ohio portion of the area in the United States House of Representatives. Construction on the bridge started in 1997 and it opened in 2000. The Simon Kenton Bridge, a suspension bridge built in 1932, is located nearby.

See also
 
 
 
 
 List of crossings of the Ohio River

References

External links
 
 William H. Harsha Bridge at American Consulting Engineers
 William H. Harsha Bridge at Bridges & Tunnels

Harsha
Harsha
Harsha
Buildings and structures in Brown County, Ohio
Bridges completed in 2001
Towers in Kentucky
Towers in Ohio
U.S. Route 68
Transportation in Brown County, Ohio
Buildings and structures in Maysville, Kentucky
Harsha
U.S. Route 62
Bridges of the United States Numbered Highway System